This is a list of law enforcement agencies in the state of Tennessee.

According to the United States Bureau of Justice Statistics' 2008 Census of State and Local Law Enforcement Agencies, the state had 375 law enforcement agencies employing 15,976 sworn police officers, about 256 for each 100,000 residents.

State agencies 

 Tennessee Alcoholic Beverage Commission
 Tennessee Bureau of Investigation
 Tennessee Department of Correction
 Tennessee Department of Revenue
 Tennessee Department of Safety
 Tennessee Highway Patrol
 Tennessee Wildlife Resources Agency
 Tennessee Governor's Task Force on Marijuana Eradication

County agencies 

 Anderson County Sheriff's Office
 Bedford County Sheriff's Office
Benton County Sheriff's Office
Bledsoe County Sheriff's Office
 Blount County Sheriff's Office
 Bradley County Sheriff's Office
Campbell County Sheriff's Office
Cannon County Sheriff's Office
Carroll County Sheriff's Office
 Carter County Sheriff's Office
 Cheatham County Sheriff's Office
 Chester County Sheriff's Office
Claiborne County Sheriff's Office
Clay County Sheriff's Office
Cocke County Sheriff's Office
 Coffee County Sheriff's Office
Crockett County Sheriff's Office
Cumberland County Sheriff's Office
 Davidson County Sheriff's Office
Decatur County Sheriff's Office
DeKalb County Sheriff's Office
 Dickson County Sheriff's Office
Dyer County Sheriff's Office
Fayette County Sheriff's Office
 Fentress County Sheriff's Office
 Franklin County Sheriff's Office
 Gibson County Sheriff's Office
 Giles County Sheriff's Office
Grainger County Sheriff's Office
Greene County Sheriff's Office
 Grundy County Sheriff's Office
Hamblen County Sheriff's Office
 Hamilton County Sheriff's Office
Hancock County Sheriff's Office
Hardeman County Sheriff's Office
Hardin County Sheriff's Office
 Hawkins County Sheriff's Office
Haywood County Sheriff's Office
 Henderson County Sheriff's Office
Henry County Sheriff's Office
Hickman County Sheriff's Office
Houston County Sheriff's Office
 Humphreys County Sheriff's Office
Jackson County Sheriff's Office
Jefferson County Sheriff's Office
Johnson County Sheriff's Office
 Knox County Sheriff's Office
Lake County Sheriff's Office
Lauderdale County Sheriff's Office
Lawrence County Sheriff's Office
 Lewis County Sheriff's Office
Lincoln County Sheriff's Office
 Loudon County Sheriff's Office
Macon County Sheriff's Office
 Madison County Sheriff's Office
Marion County Sheriff's Office
 Marshall County Sheriff's Office
Maury County Sheriff's Office
 McMinn County Sheriff's Office
 McNairy County Sheriff's Office
Meigs County Sheriff's Office
Monroe County Sheriff's Office
Montgomery County Sheriff's Office
Moore County Sheriff's Office
 Morgan County Sheriff's Office
Obion County Sheriff's Office
Overton County Sheriff's Office
Perry County Sheriff's Office
Pickett County Sheriff's Office
Polk County Sheriff's Office
Putnam County Sheriff's Office
Rhea County Sheriff's Office
Roane County Sheriff's Office
Robertson County Sheriff's Office
 Rutherford County Sheriff's Office
Scott County Sheriff's Office
Sequatchie County Sheriff's Office
 Sevier County Sheriff's Office
 Shelby County Sheriff's Office
Smith County Sheriff's Office
Stewart County Sheriff's Office
 Sullivan County Sheriff's Office
Sumner County Sheriff's Office
 Tipton County Sheriff's Office
 Trousdale County Sheriff's Office
Unicoi County Sheriff's Office
Union County Sheriff's Office
Van Buren County Sheriff's Office
 Warren County Sheriff's Office
 Washington County Sheriff's Office
Wayne County Sheriff's Office
Weakley County Sheriff's Office
White County Sheriff's Office
 Williamson County Sheriff's Office
 Wilson County Sheriff's Office

Municipal agencies 

Adamsville Police Department
Alamo Police Department
 Alcoa Police Department
Alexandria Police Department
 Algood Police Department
 Ardmore Police Department
 Ashland City Police Department
Atoka Police Department
Athens Police Department
 Bartlett Police Department
Baxter Police Department
Bean Station Police Department
 Belle Meade Police Department
 Bells Police Department
 Benton Police Department
 Blaine Police Department
Bluff City Police Department
Bolivar Police Department
Bradford Police Department
 Brentwood Police Department
Brighton Police Department
 Bristol Police Department
Brownsville Police Department
Bruceton Police Department
 Calhoun Police Department
Camden Police Department
Carthage Police Department
 Caryville Police Department
Celina Police Department
Centerville Police Department
Charleston Police Department
 Chattanooga Police Department
Church Hill Police Department
 Clarksville Police Department
 Cleveland Police Department
 Clinton Police Department
 Collegedale Police Department
Collierville Police Department
Collinwood Police Department
 Columbia Police Department
 Cookeville Police Department
Coopertown Police Department
Covington Police Department
Cowan Police Department
Crossville Police Department
Cumberland Gap Police Department
Dandridge Police Department
Dayton Police Department
Decatur Police Department
Decaturville Police Department
Decherd Police Department
Dickson Police Department
Dover Police Department
Dresden Police Department
Dunlap Police Department
Dyer Police Department
Dyersburg Police Department
 East Ridge Police Department
 Elizabethton Police Department
Elkton Police Department
Englewood Police Department
Erin Police Department
 Erwin Police Department
Estill Springs Police Department
Etowah Police Department
Fairview Police Department
 Fayetteville Police Department
 Franklin Police Department
Gainesboro Police Department
 Gallatin Police Department
Gallaway Police Department
 Gatlinburg Police Department
 Germantown Police Department
Gleason Police Department
Goodlettsville Police Department
Gordonsville Police Department
Graysville Police Department
Greenbrier Police Department
Greeneville Police Department
Greenfield Police Department
Halls Police Department
 Harriman Police Department
Hartsville Police Department
Henderson Police Department
Hendersonville Police Department
Hohenwald Police Department
Hollow Rock Police Department
Hornbeak Police Department
Humboldt Police Department
Huntingdon Police Department
Huntland Police Department
Jacksboro Police Department
 Jackson Police Department
Jamestown Police Department
Jasper Police Department
Jefferson City Police Department
Jellico Police Department
 Johnson City Police Department
Jonesborough Police Department
Kenton Police Department
 Kimball Police Department
Kingsport Police Department
Kingston Police Department
 Knoxville Police Department
 La Vergne Police Department
 Lafayette Police Department
LaFollette Police Department
Lake City Police Department
Lawrenceburg Police Department
Lebanon Police Department
Lenoir City Police Department
Lewisburg Police Department
Lexington Police Department
 Livingston Police Department
Lookout Mountain Police Department
Loretto Police Department
Loudon Police Department
Madisonville Police Department
Manchester Police Department
Martin Police Department
 Maryville Police Department
Mason Police Department
Maynardville Police Department
McEwen Police Department
McKenzie Police Department
McMinnville Police Department
Medina Police Department
 Memphis Police Department
 Metropolitan Nashville Police Department
Middleton Police Department
Milan Police Department
Millersville Police Department
Millington Police Department
Monteagle City Police Department
Monterey Police Department
 Morristown Police Department
 Mount Carmel Police Department
 Mount Juliet Police Department
Mount Pleasant Police Department
Mountain City Police Department
Munford Police Department
 Murfreesboro Police Department
New Johnsonville Police Department
New Market Police Department
New Tazewell Police Department
Newbern Police Department
Newport Police Department
Niota Police Department
Nolensville Police Department
Norris Police Department
 Oak Ridge Police Department
Obion Police Department
Oliver Springs Police Department
Oneida Police Department
Paris Police Department
Parsons Police Department
 Pigeon Forge Police Department
Pikeville Police Department
Pittman Center Police Department
Plainview Police Department
Pleasant View Police Department
Portland Police Department
Powells Crossroads Police Department
Pulaski Police Department
 Red Bank Police Department
Red Boiling Springs Police Department
Ridgely Police Department
Ripley Police Department
Rockwood Police Department
Rutledge Police Department
Savannah Police Department
Scotts Hill Police Department
Selmer Police Department
 Sevierville Police Department
Sewanee Police Department
Sharon Police Department
 Shelbyville Police Department
Signal Mountain Police Department
Smithville Police Department
 Smyrna Police Department
Sneedville Police Department
Soddy-Daisy Police Department
Somerville Police Department
 South Pittsburg Police Department
 Sparta Police Department
Spencer Police Department
Spring City Police Department
Spring Hill Police Department
Springfield Police Department
Surgoinsville Police Department
Sweetwater Police Department
Tazewell Police Department
Tellico Plains Police Department
Tiptonville Police Department
Townsend Police Department
Tracy City Police Department
Trenton Police Department
Trezevant Police Department
Troy Police Department
Tullahoma Police Department
Unicoi Police Department
Union City Police Department
Vonore Police Department
Wartrace Police Department
Watertown Police Department
Waverly Police Department
Waynesboro Police Department
Westmoreland Police Department
White Bluff Police Department
 White House Police Department
White Pine Police Department
Whiteville Police Department
Whitwell Police Department
Winchester Police Department
Woodbury Police Department

College/University Police Agencies 

 East Tennessee State University DPS
 Tennessee Valley Authority Police
 University of Tennessee Police
 Vanderbilt University Police Department
 Middle Tennessee State University Police Department
 Knox County Schools Security Division

Disbanded/Defunct agencies 
 Ridgetop Police Department
 Lakewood Police Department
 Walden Police Department

See also 
 Law enforcement in the United States

References 

 
Tennessee
Law enforcement agencies